The Lawrence Farm is a historic farm at 9 Lawrence Road (now effectively the driveway to the house off Marlborough Road) in Troy, New Hampshire. Established in the early 19th century, the property has been in continuous ownership by the same family since then. Its farmstead, including a c. 1806 farmhouse, exemplifies the changing trends in domestic agricultural practices of the 19th and 20th centuries. The farm was listed on the National Register of Historic Places in 2000.

Description and history
This property includes a Federal-style farmhouse built c. 1806, a horsebarn c. 1870, and two smaller 20th-century outbuildings. The foundations of an older barn, which was historically attached to the house, remain.

Land that now makes up the farm was first occupied about 1783, when a log house was built by Joseph Parker. After passing through several owners, it was purchased by Silas Wheeler in 1806. He is credited with building the oldest portion of the farmhouse, on the site of the original log house. Lawrence Road, now fractured by unmaintained stream crossings, ran from the house to a mill Wheeler also owned. The Wheeler property was purchased in 1845 by George Lawrence. Lawrence expanded the landholdings of the farm, and also expanded the house, adding an ell to make room for his family, as well as his widowed mother and spinster sister. Lawrence was a successful farmer, and one of Troy's wealthiest residents at the time of his death. His descendants have continued to own the land, leasing the fields to local farmers.

See also
National Register of Historic Places listings in Cheshire County, New Hampshire

References

Houses on the National Register of Historic Places in New Hampshire
Federal architecture in New Hampshire
Houses completed in 1806
Houses in Cheshire County, New Hampshire
Farms on the National Register of Historic Places in New Hampshire
National Register of Historic Places in Cheshire County, New Hampshire
Troy, New Hampshire